The Victorious War Museum, or the Victorious Fatherland Liberation War Museum, is a history/military museum dedicated to the Korean War located in the North Korean capital-city of Pyongyang.

The museum was first set up in August 1953 and built in the Central District of Pyongyang, initially named as the "Fatherland Liberation War Museum." In April 1963, it was relocated to the Sosong District and re-established in a purpose-built building compound.

In 2014, the museum was renovated and upgraded significantly and the new design included a building spanning across the nearby Botong River, together with a large panorama-style display hall at the top.

The general character and influence of the museum reflects the official North Korean view of their success in fighting against their American arch-enemy and its puppet state of South Korea, and much of the museum presents the victories of North Korea and its military over its enemies, which are shown to be utterly defeated and broken by the might of the DPRK. Such can be seen from how a display in the museum shows a large cache of captured US infantry-based weapons and combat-helmets stacked up, presenting the idea of the severe casualties sustained by the US military in the Korean War.

Exhibits in the museum include a 360-degree full-scale diorama and cyclorama of the Battle of Taejon during the Korean War, along with displays of North Korean military hardware used in that conflict, such as Soviet T-34/85 tanks, anti-aircraft artillery, naval craft as well as warplanes. Also on display are several captured American (and some British) military equipment, such as ex-US M26 Pershing, M4 Sherman and M24 Chaffee tanks, a former British Army  Universal Carrier armoured personnel carrier (APC), along with some artillery guns and downed aircraft of the US-led UN forces fighting against North Korea. Local and foreign visitors to the museum are allowed to board the ship, now permanently moored on the river beside the museum, and enter and see the ship's secret code-room (which contains classified military intelligence and information on board) and former ship and crew artifacts now put on display, such as a US flag.

Alleged sinking of USS Baltimore
The museum has several exhibits that claim that the U.S. Navy heavy cruiser  was sunk by Motor Torpedo Boats belonging to the Korean People's Navy on 2 July 1950. Exhibits include a poster and the supposed actual torpedo boat which supposedly sank the American cruiser. However, the cruiser, at the time of its alleged loss, was still in the U.S. Navy's decommissioned reserve, and had been as such since 1946. In 1951, it was recommissioned and assigned to the Atlantic Fleet. In 1955, Baltimore was transferred to the Pacific Fleet two years after the Korean War. Clearly, the ship was nowhere near Korea during the three years of conflict there.

The actual battle involved light cruiser  as well as the Royal Navy's sloop  and cruiser . Together, they destroyed several (at least 3) North Korean torpedo boats without suffering losses or damage.

See also 

 List of museums in North Korea
 War Memorial of Korea, Seoul, its South Korean counterpart

References

Further reading

External links 

 - Photos and 360 virtual tour Quick tour of the Victorious Fatherland Liberation War Museum

Museums in Pyongyang
Korean War memorials and cemeteries
Museums established in 1974